Vanessa McNeal-Atadoga (born August 3, 1993) is an American social activist, public speaker, and documentary filmmaker. She directed the documentary that features stories of five male survivors of sexual violence titled The Voiceless, and We Are Survivors, a documentary that examines the experiences of eight victims of sexual abuse.

In 2019, McNeal released her fourth documentary film titled Gridshock to expose the sex trafficking industry in the state of Iowa.  McNeal is a two time Tedx speaker.

Education
Vanessa graduated from Iowa State University in 2015 with a Bachelor of Science (B.Sc.) degree in Child Adult and Family Services and a Master of Social Works (MSW) degree from the University of Northern Iowa in 2017.

Career
Vanessa's career in filmmaking, social activism and speaking kicked off after the release of her first film titled I am: The Vanessa McNeal Story. Since then she has spoken at various college events, for the US National Guard, and produced three other documentary films respectively titled We are Survivors, The Voiceless, and Gridshock.

In 2015, she began her journey in making films that focuses on investigating sexual violence and influencing social change by producing a short film about her childhood experiences with sexual abuse. She has been hosted as a guest at several college campuses, government agencies and community events around the U.S to share her stories and screen her films with the aim of creating social change.

McNeal's awards include winning best director for her film “The Voiceless,” Women Filmmaker Award of Recognition, 2017 YWCA Young Woman of Tomorrow Award of Recognition, 2018 STATEment Maker award and in 2019 she was presented with the Outstanding Iowa Anti-Trafficking Service Award.

Filmography
 I am: The Vanessa McNeal Story (2015)
 We are Survivors (2016)
 The Voiceless (2017)
 Gridshock (2019)

References

External links
 

Living people
1993 births
African-American activists

Iowa State University alumni
University of Northern Iowa alumni
American women documentary filmmakers
American documentary filmmakers